Elk Hills Elementary School District is a public school district based in Kern County, California.

References

External links
 

School districts in Kern County, California